Sychnovalva syrrhapta is a species of moth of the family Tortricidae. It is found in Brazil in the states of Paraná and Santa Catarina.

References

	

Moths described in 1997
Archipini